Melis is both a surname and a given name. Notable people with the name include:

Given name
Melis Abzalov (1938–2016), Uzbek actor, screenwriter, film director and producer
Melis Birkan (born 1981), Turkish actress
Melis Gerritsen (born 1939), Dutch track cyclist
Melis van de Groep (born 1958), Dutch politician
Melis Myrzakmatov, Kyrgyzstani politician
Melis Özçiğdem (born 1982), Turkish football player and referee
Melis Sezer (born 1993), Turkish tennis player
Melis Stoke (c.1235-c.1305 ), Dutch writer and clerk of Floris V, count of Holland
Melis Yılmaz (born 1997), Turkish volleyball player
Melis Myrzakmatov (born 1969), from 2009 until 2013 mayor of Osh, Kyrgyzstan's second largest city
Melis van de Groep (born 1958), Dutch politician of the Reformed Political League 
Tuğba Melis Türk (born 1990), Turkish actress and model

Surname
Alberto Melis (born 1993), Italian football midfielder
Anastasios Melis, American plant biologist
Antal Melis (born 1946), Hungarian rower
Béla Melis (born 1959), Hungarian football forward
Bill Melis (born 1960), Greek–American basketball player
Carmen Melis (1885–1967), Italian opera singer
Charles Melis (fl. 1920), Belgian long-distance runner
Cornelia Melis (born 1960), Aruban long-distance runner
Dorothea Melis (1938–2015), German fashion journalist
Efisio Melis (1890–1970), Sardinian folk musician
 (1914–1973), Italian economic historian
Felipe Melis (born 1979), male Spanish long jumper of Cuban origin
Giovanni Melis Fois (1916–2009), Italian Prelate of Roman Catholic Church
 (1923–2009), Hungarian opera bariton
Harry Melis (born 1957), Dutch football winger
José Melis (1920-2005), Cuban-American bandleader and television personality
José Manuel Hermosa Melis (born 1989),  Spanish footballer who plays for CD Alcoyano
Karin Melis Mey (born 1983), South African-born Turkish long jumper 
László Melis (born 1953), Hungarian composer and violinist
Manon Melis (born 1986), Dutch football forward, daughter of Harry
 (1939–1994), Italian jazz musician
Roger Melis (1940–2009), German photographer
Roland Melis (born 1974), Netherlands Antilles triathlete
Tancred Melis (1934–2013), South African cricketer
Vito Melis (born 1909), Italian boxer
Zoltán Melis (born 1947), Hungarian rower
Van Melis
Mirella van Melis (born 1979), Dutch track and road racing cyclist
Noud van Melis (1924–2001), Dutch football forward

See also
Duo Melis, Classical guitar duo
Melissus (disambiguation)
Meli, a surname and given name
Mellis (disambiguation)

Dutch masculine given names
Turkish feminine given names
Dutch-language surnames
Hungarian-language surnames
Italian-language surnames
Patronymic surnames

fr:Melis
it:Melis